Abu Alayej-e Sofla (also Romanized as Abū ‘Alāyej-e Soflá; also known as Albū ‘Alāyej-e Pā’īn and Albū ‘Alāyej-e Soflá) is a village in Jarahi Rural District, in the Central District of Mahshahr County, Khuzestan Province, Iran. At the 2006 census, its population was 197, in 42 families.

References 

Populated places in Mahshahr County